Sainte-Vertu is a commune in the Yonne department in Bourgogne-Franche-Comté in north-central France.

Geography
The surrounding communes are Môlay, Poilly-sur-Serein and Aigremont.

The village is traversed by the little Serein River.

Local Politics
In 2010 the mayor is Andre Oppendeau.

Demography
Recorded population peaked at 544 in 1821, but has fallen back steadily subsequently, the decline accelerating with the mechanisation of agriculture in the twentieth century.   By 2005 the recorded population stood at just 104.

See also
Communes of the Yonne department

References

External links

 Sainte-Vertu en el sitio web del INSEE (en francés)
 Information on Sainte-Vertu (in French)

Communes of Yonne